The Sebayashi Formation is a Barremian to Albian geologic formation in Japan. Dinosaur remains are among the fossils that have been recovered from the formation, although only two species, Fukuivenator and Siamosaurus, have been referred to a specific genus.

Paleofauna 

 Bivalvia indet.
 Dinosauria indet. - "Footprints"
 Ornithopoda indet. - "Footprints"
 Siamosaurus? - "Tooth (GMNH-PV-999)"
 Spinosauridae indet. "Tooth (KDC-PV-0003)"
 aff. Fukuiraptor kitadaniensis - "Tooth"
 Theropoda indet. - "Footprints"

See also 
 List of dinosaur-bearing rock formations
 List of stratigraphic units with indeterminate dinosaur fossils

References

Bibliography 
  
 

Geologic formations of Japan
Lower Cretaceous Series of Asia
Cretaceous Japan
Albian Stage
Aptian Stage
Barremian Stage
Sandstone formations
Shale formations
Conglomerate formations
Deltaic deposits
Ichnofossiliferous formations
Paleontology in Japan